The 2015–16 season was Banants's 15th season in the Armenian Premier League. They finished the season sixth in the league, whilst they also won the Armenian Cup, earning entry in to the UEFA Europa League at the first qualifying stage.

Season events
At the end of the season, Albert Ohanyan, Soslan Kalmanov, Andrey Shahgeldyan, Miguel López and Denis Mahmudov were all released by the club.

Squad

Transfers

In

Released

Competitions

Overall record

Premier League

Results summary

Results

Table

Armenian Cup

Final

Statistics

Appearances and goals

|-
|colspan="16"|Players away on loan:
|-
|colspan="16"|Players who left Banants during the season:

|}

Goal scorers

Clean sheets

Disciplinary Record

References

FC Urartu seasons
Banants